The Mission of Palestine in London is the diplomatic mission of Palestine in the United Kingdom. It is not a fully-fledged mission owing to the lack of normalized relations and tensions with Israel. It was upgraded from a delegation to a mission by Foreign Secretary William Hague in 2011.

Gallery

References

External links 
 
 Official site

Palestine
London
State of Palestine–United Kingdom relations
Buildings and structures in the London Borough of Hammersmith and Fulham
Hammersmith